The women's individual recurve archery competition at the 2018 Asian Games was held from 21 to 28 August at the Gelora Bung Karno Sports Complex Archery Field in Jakarta, Indonesia. It was the eleventh time the event was held as part of the Asian Games sports programme since the sport's debut in the competition in 1978. A total of 68 archers from 25 nations participated. Jung Dasomi of South Korea entered as the defending champion, having won the women's individual gold medal at the 2014 Asian Games.

South Korea entered as the dominant nation in the event, having won eight of the previous ten gold medals. They were however upset in the latter stages of the tournament, with their two archers in the elimination rounds, double Olympic champion Chang Hye-jin and top seed Kang Chae-young, being eliminated in the quarter-finals and semi-finals respectively. These defeats led to the first women's individual event final at the Asian Games not to feature a Korean archer. The final was contested between Zhang Xinyan of China and Indonesia's Diananda Choirunisa, Zhang winning in five sets to claim her nation's first ever Asian Games gold medal in the women's individual discipline. Kang recovered to take third place, defeating Lei Chien-ying of Chinese Taipei to win the bronze medal.

South Korea's trio of Kang, Lee, and Chang comfortably topped the 72-arrow ranking round held on 21 August, with defending champion Jung finishing fifth behind Lei Chien-ying of Chinese Taipei. Due to the change in the format of the ranking round, Kang's total of 681 was automatically registered as a new Asian Games record. As per the results of the Korean national selection trials held prior to the Games, Kang and Chang advanced as the two Korean archers to contest the elimination rounds despite Lee outscoring Chang in their 72-arrows to finish one position higher.

The elimination rounds began two days after the ranking round on 23 August. India's challenge ended in the 1/8 elimination round after Kumari lost to Lei by seven set points to three. The 1/8 elimination round also saw Indonesia's Choirunisa receive a walkover after her opponent, 2012 Paralympic champion Zahra Nemati of Iran, was disqualified for arriving at the competition site for the match 30 seconds late. Nemati told reporters that she had been sent for lunch, but shortly after leaving the site was told that the competition had resumed and was not able to return in time.

The top seven seeds each successfully reached the quarter-finals, which began just before midday on 23 August. The match between Choirunisa and Chang featured the biggest upset, with Chang delivering an uneven performance typified by a pair of sevens in her third set and the failure to win the fifth set to tie the game, allowing the Indonesian to take an unexpected victory by seven set points to three and advance to the semi-final. The Korea JoongAng Daily suggested Chang's defeat was due to the pressure placed upon her shoulders from national expectations to win gold medals in both the women's team recurve and the mixed recurve events, in addition to the women's individual recurve. South Korea's hopes of a gold medal were therefore pinned on top seed Kang, who had earlier dispatched Cao Hui of China in four sets to set up a semi-final tie with Cao's compatriot Zhang Xinyan.

The two semi-finals matches held later on the afternoon of 23 August saw two further upsets. Kang's defeat in the semi-finals to Zhang, who held a world ranking of 113, led to the first women's individual recurve final at the Asian Games without a South Korea archer present in four decades of competition. The failure to contest for a fourth successive gold medal in one of the team's strongest disciplines, as well as shortcomings by South Korean athletes in a number of different sports across the Games, led The Chosun Ilbo to describe the national sporting situation as "desperate" in the run-up to the 2020 Summer Olympics. The second semi-final saw Choirunisa triumph against Lei despite a head-to-head record that strongly favoured the Chinese Taipei archer. Choirunisa's win made her the first individual female archer from Indonesia to reach an Asian Games gold medal contest. The consistency shown by the Indonesian since the beginning of the elimination rounds was noted by Edi Purwanto of Pikiran Rakyat as key to her success, particularly in the final four sets of the semi-final when Lei's arrows dropped into the 7 and 8-rings.

After a break of five days, in which the team recurve and mixed recurve events were completed, the competition resumed on the morning of 28 August for the two medal matches. Following the success of Kang, Chang, and Lee in the women's team recurve over Chinese Taipei the previous morning, Kang added a second medal to her 2018 Asian Games tally by defeating Lei in five sets to win the bronze medal.

The gold medal match was held right after the conclusion of the bronze medal match. In front of a crowd that included the President of Indonesia, Joko Widodo, Zhang claimed the gold medal with a perfect score of 30 in both her first and final set. Zhang's success came despite the Games being only her second senior international competition, her only previous experience being the fourth stage of the 2018 Archery World Cup in Berlin one month earlier. Choirunisa earned the Indonesia's second recurve archery silver medal of the Games after Riau Ega Agatha's loss to South Korean Lee Woo-seok in the men's individual event earlier in the day. Following a reapportionment of qualification spots at the 2019 World Archery Championships, Choirunisa's silver medal finish earned Indonesia a place at the 2020 Summer Olympics.

Schedule
All times are Western Indonesia Time (UTC+07:00)

Results
Legend
DNS — Did not start
WO — Won by walkover

Ranking round

Knockout round

Bracket

Finals

Section 1

Section 2

Section 3

Section 4

1/32 eliminations

1/16 eliminations

1/8 eliminations

Quarterfinals

Semifinals

Bronze medal match

Gold medal match

References

External links
Archery at the official website of the 2018 Asian Games
2018 Asian Games at World Archery

Women's individual recurve